The 2016 Rochdale Metropolitan Borough Council election took place on 5 May 2016 to elect members of Rochdale Metropolitan Borough Council in England. This was on the same day as other local elections.

Election results

References

2016 English local elections
2016
2010s in Greater Manchester